There has been some opposition in Wales to the granting of the title "Prince of Wales", and investiture of the prince of Wales by the British monarch. 
The title is currently held by Prince William.

Background

Native Welsh Princes 

Following the uniting of Wales under the rule of the Llywelyn princes, King Edward I of England led 15,000 men to capture Wales. English monarchs had made multiple failed attempts by English monarchs to maintain a grip on the region prior to this. Resistance was led by Llywelyn ap Gruffydd who also made an attempt to recruit more Welsh soldiers in mid-Wales. Llywelyn was killed in the Battle of Orewin Bridge by English soldiers in an ambush trick under the guise of discussions. His head was paraded through London and placed on a Tower of London spike with a mocking crown of laurel leaves. Llywelyn's brother Dafydd, took over leadership of Welsh fighters, but was caught in 1283. He was dragged through the streets of Shrewsbury by a horse, hanged, revived and disemboweled by English officials. His bowels were thrown into a fire as he watched. Finally, his head was cut off and placed on a Tower of London spike next to his brother Llywelyn, and his body cut into quarters.

Following the deaths of Llywelyn and Dafydd, King Edward sought to end Welsh independence and introduced the royal ordinance of the Statute of Rhuddlan in 1284. The statute was a constitutional change causing Wales to lose its de facto independence and formed the Principality of Wales within the "Realm of England". The Statute of Rhuddlan of 1284 then annexed Wales under the crown England.

English (then British) heir apparent 
William Camden's Britannia describes the beginning of the English Prince of Wales as heir apparent after Llywelyn ap Gruffydd was "slain". According to conventional wisdom, since 1301 the Prince of Wales has usually been the eldest living son (only if he is also the heir apparent) of the King or Queen Regnant of England (subsequently of Great Britain, 1707, and of the United Kingdom, 1801). The title is neither automatic or heritable; it merges with the Crown when its holder eventually accedes to the throne, or reverts to the Crown if its holder predeceases the current monarch, leaving the sovereign free to grant it to the new heir apparent (such as the late prince's son or brother).

Glyndwr Welsh revolt 
Since conquest, there have been Welsh rebellions against English rule. The last, and the most significant revolt was the Glyndŵr Rising of 1400–1415, which briefly restored independence. Owain Glyndŵr held the first Welsh parliament (Senedd) in Machynlleth in 1404 where he was proclaimed Prince of Wales and a second parliament in 1405 in Harlech, until his eventual defeat.

Opposition to the title and investiture (whilst held by Charles)

Anti-investiture movement of Charles as Prince of Wales 
The 1960s movement surrounding the investiture of Charles as Prince of Wales has historically been described as the "anti-investiture movement" and "anti-investiture sentiment". The investiture occurred during a period of revival of the Welsh national consciousness with an outspoken section considering it as an English Prince being imposed upon Wales.
Communities and institutions were organisations were divided on the issue of the investiture. These included the Urdd, Plaid Cymru, the Gorsedd and non-conformist denominations. Students in all of the University of Wales campuses held multiple sit-in protests and hunger strikes to show their opposition to the investiture. The FWA and Mudiad Amddiffyn Cymru also added to the tension. Because of the tension and protests leading up to the investiture of July 1969, the UK government drafted many soldiers, detectives and agent provocateurs to secure a smoothly running ceremony in Caernarfon.

Welsh singer Dafydd Iwan voiced his opposition and protest against investing Charles as Prince of Wales and also wrote a song "Carlo" mocking Charles. Iwan stated "[It is a] song to be taken lightly, ... like the Investiture itself, and every other vanity. The shame is that there was meaning and a serious purpose to [the role of] Prince of Wales once".

Tedi Millward, professor of Welsh at Aberystwyth University, became friendly with Charles in the lead-up to the investiture whilst teaching him some Welsh. He refused invitations to the investiture ceremony, as well as the 1981 wedding of Prince Charles and Lady Diana Spencer. Charles himself said in 2019 "Every day I had to go down to the town where I went to these lectures, and most days there seemed to be a demonstration going on against me".The investiture of Charles as "Prince of Wales was controversial and also led to widespread protests in Wales. The group "Cofia 1282" ("Remember 1282", the death year of Llywelyn the Last) also held protests against the investiture.
The Welsh Language society (Cymdeithas yr Iaith) also held a rally against the investiture on 29 August, 1969 at Cilmeri, the site of the death of Llywelyn the Last.

On the day of the investiture, a few nonviolent protesters were arrested. Some were escorted away carrying signs saying "Cymru nid Prydain" (Wales not Britain). Others booed and made obscene gestures at the royal carriages. One protestor threw an egg at the Queen’s carriage as it passed by. Another threw a banana skin under the feet of the military escort as it processed by.

Later opposition to Prince of Wales title 
The successful Welsh rock band Manic Street Preachers released a song "Charles Windsor" with lyrics describing the deposing of Charles.

The title of Prince of Wales is currently granted to the heir apparent of the reigning British monarch and confers no responsibility for the government in Wales. Because the title has no constitutional value or meaning according to Plaid Cymru, the party called for the title to be ended altogether in 2006.

In 2018, over 30,000 people signed a petition against the renaming of Second Severn Crossing as the "Prince of Wales bridge".

Welsh actor Michael Sheen has called for the royal family to end the practice of handing the title of Prince of Wales to the heir apparent to the English throne. Sheen stated that it would be a "really meaningful and powerful gesture for that title to no longer be held in the same way as it has before, that would be an incredibly meaningful thing I think to happen". On the matter, Sheen has also said "There’s an opportunity to do that at that point. Don’t necessarily just because of habit and without thinking just carry on that tradition that was started as a humiliation to our country". "Why not change that as we come to this moment where things will inevitably change".

Opposition to the title and investiture (whilst held by William)

Before title announcement 
The naming of the cup for the winner of Wales v South Africa rugby matches as the "Prince William cup" caused considerable controversy in Wales. Many people called on the WRU to rename the trophy in honour of Welsh international rugby star Ray Gravell, who died on 31 October 2007. During a tribute to Gravell at the inaugural match the stadium announcer asked the crowd to remember Ray as 'gwir dywysog Cymru', ("true prince of Wales"). Gravell's funeral was attended by over 10,000 people, including Rhodri Morgan, First Minister of Wales. On-line petitions were also launched. The matter was raised in the National Assembly for Wales by Helen Mary Jones AM backed by multiple assembly members. Multiple MPs from different parties also introduced a motion in Westminster calling on the Welsh Rugby Union to name the cup after the late Ray Gravell. William has served as patron of the Wales Rugby Union since December 2016.

Following the death of Queen Elizabeth II on 8 September 2022, which led to the vacancy of the Prince of Wales title, Dafydd Elis-Thomas said "I think this title will disappear because it doesn't make any sense for a devolved, democratic country like Wales to have a prince these days" and "What sense does it make to have a Prince of Wales who has no constitutional function? But that is a matter for discussion".

Aftermath of title announcement 
Upon King Charles III's visit to Cardiff Castle on 16 September, which coincided with Owain Glyndŵr Day, giant Owain Glyndŵr flags were displayed by some protestors and one placard included "End Prince of Wales title".

On the day of Charles' visit, Michael Sheen asked for the Prince of Wales title to be ended. In a video message posted to his Twitter account, Sheen pondered whether Charles and William appreciated the history and traditions of Wales, and pointed out that the celebrations for Owain Glyndŵr Day were cancelled "because of the visit of an English monarch". He questioned whether the visit was scheduled on purpose, calling it "insensitive to the point of insult" if so, and added, "And if it wasn't done on purpose – if it was done accidentally without realising what that day was – then one does wonder what being Prince of Wales was so long actually meant if you're not aware of what that day means." He ended his video by quoting Lily Smalls, Mrs. Beynon’s maid, from Dylan Thomas's Under Milk Wood: "Where you get that thing from, Willy? Got it from my father, silly. Give it back then, love".

A petition calling for the end of the Prince of Wales title was started following its vacancy. By 17 September, despite Prince William receiving the title, the petition calling for the end of the title had received over 30,000 signatures. The petition states "The title remains an insult to Wales and is a symbol of historical oppression. The title also implies that Wales is still a principality, undermining Wales's status as a nation and a country". "In addition, the title has absolutely no constitutional role for Wales, which is now a devolved country with a national Parliament"."Whatever your political views, this is an important step for us of all in Wales".

In response to the creation of the title, former leader of Plaid Cymru, Leanne Wood said "Wales has no need for a prince". Current leader of Plaid Cymru, Adam Price stated "I don't believe there is a role in modern, democratic Wales for the Prince of Wales, and I haven't changed my view on that".

A Welsh independence thinktank Melin Drafod, also took the position that the Prince of Wales title should be abandoned with its chairman saying "Our position is we think that the title should be abandoned." He added that the title is "divisive and contentious and sets Welsh people against each other" and was imposed on the Welsh people without democratic consent.

On 6 October, Gwynedd Council, the local authority where Charles' investiture took place, voted by 46 votes to four, declaring opposition to the title of ‘Prince of Wales’ and against holding another investiture in Wales.

On 30 October, Senedd Llywydd Elin Jones said to WalesOnline that an investiture is not a constitutional requirement and that 21st century Wales does not need an investiture. She added "Ceremonial Prince of Wales investitures were therefore the product of the political imagination of the 20th Century and should be consigned to that century. The Welsh people and the Welsh Parliament can design a modern relationship with the Prince of Wales, based on people not pageantry. If William and Kate want to meet people throughout Wales to learn first-hand of their hopes and concerns, then today's politicians should free them to do so, rather than encumber them with the controversy of investiture. 21st century Wales does not need an investiture. The 21st century monarchy may not want it either."

William's continued presidency of the English football association has been questioned in media, particularly as Wales played England in the FIFA World Cup 2022 and will "remain a regular fixture cheering on England" despite receiving the honorary title of Prince of Wales. In November, William was criticised for him for holding the Prince of Wales title whilst having affiliations with England football, particularly after he presented England jerseys to the squad in advance of the FIFA world cup in which both Wales and England would be playing. Those who criticised him included Welsh football followers and the Welsh actor Michael Sheen who tweeted, "He can, of course, support whoever he likes and as Pres of FA his role makes visit understandable - but surely he sees holding the title Prince of Wales at same time is entirely inappropriate? Not a shred of embarrassment? Or sensitivity to the problem here?". Following this controversy, Kensington Palace also released a statement saying an investiture is "not on the table" with William visiting Cardiff with plans to tell the people of Wales that there are no formal plans for an investiture ceremony, aware of the controversy of the 1969 event.

Proposals for a debate and Welsh decision 
When asked if he was glad about the decision, the First Minister of Wales, Mark Drakeford stated, "Well, it's a decision that has been made".

Different investiture debate 
Lord Elis-Thomas said in 2022 on previous discussions he had with Prince Charles, "I can tell you in discussions with him when he was still Prince of Wales, when I had cultural responsibilities in the Welsh Government, one of the issues I did raise with him was that I hoped there would never again be an investiture in Caernarfon Castle. (Prince Charles) laughed and said, 'Do you think I want to put William through what I went through?".

Following the announcement of the title, the First minister of Wales, Mark Drakeford revealed that he heard the news about the appointment on a new Prince of Wales on the same day as everyone else. The first minister added "The Wales of 2022 is not the Wales of 1969. I don't think it would be sensible to look back and say you could simply replicate that". "My only advice, if it was ever sought, would be to give these things time. There is no rush". After meeting Charles at Cardiff Castle, Drakeford said "Well, I certainly don't think that 1969 is a good guide for what should happen in 2022. Wales is a very different place". "The nature of the monarchy has developed over that period. My message is that we shouldn't be in a rush about all of this". "We should allow the new prince, as I say, to become familiar with his new responsibilities, develop the job in a way that will work for him and will work for Wales". "And then we can think about how and whether there is a need for any further ceremonial underpinning of what has already been announced".

Leader of Plaid Cymru, Adam Price stated that "On the question of investiture then it's the people of Wales, through the democratically elected representatives, that should decide on that, not have that decision made in London by the UK Government". Price stated that the Senedd should make the decision on whether to hold an investiture following a  "national conversation". On BBC Radio Wales Breakfast, Price said "It is not necessary and it was decided in 1911 and 1969, essentially by politicians, to hold the ceremony so I think that it is a legitimate area of discussion". Price added, "I think the first minister was right to say it's important that there is an opportunity for us in Wales to have a conversation about whether we want to have that ceremony, which effectively invests in the title of an official role, and a national status, like almost a constitutional role".

Title debate 
Welsh Liberal Democrat leader, Jane Dodds stated "There should be a debate - but not right now. Let's have that discussion and see what the people of Wales actually want."

Welsh independence group YesCymru are neutral when it comes to the monarchy, but have taken the position that a decision on a "Prince of Wales should be collective decision of the people of Wales."

Plaid Cymru called for a national conversation and Senedd vote on the matter of the title. The Welsh government responded saying that the matter had already been decided.

Laura McAllister, Welsh academic, former international footballer and senior sports administrator said that the title merits a proper debate due to its historical and political controversy.

Support for title and investiture

Title held by Charles 
Although the investiture of Charles in 1969 took place during a period of social change and a growing Welsh nationalist movement, it was largely welcomed by people in Wales. 

The investiture was also attended by invitation, by 3,500 people who lived and worked in Wales. In the UK, the press focused on the pomp and regalia, with some newspapers stating "Welsh go wild for Their Royal Prince" and "Proud Wales takes Prince to her heart." 

It was also supported by the Welsh secretary of state at the time, George Thomas, although he remained a controversial figure in Wales. Thomas later stated to Prime minister Harold Wilson that Charles' speech had "boosted Welsh nationalism."

Prior to the death of Queen Elizabeth, in June 2022, ITV/YouGov poll showed 46% of adults in Wales wanted the Prince of Wales title to continue, 31% said it should be abolished, with 23% don't knows.

Title held by William 
During his first address, King Charles III said of his son William, "Today I am proud to create him Prince of Wales, Tywysog Cymru. The country whose title I've been so greatly privileged to bear during so much of my life of duty." According to Buckingham Palace, "The prince and princess [of Wales] look forward to celebrating Wales's proud history and traditions as well as a future that is full of promise".

According to the first minister of Wales, William will be absolutely aware of the sensitivities that surround the title. Conservative MP for Clwyd West, David Jones, said "I think it was deeply inappropriate of Drakeford to comment on something which is entirely a matter for the new King, not Drakeford or any other politician for that matter". He added "Drakeford suggested they should get to know Wales. Well, I can say as an MP in north Wales, that the new Prince and Princess of Wales know North Wales much better than he does." Conservative MS for South Wales East, Laura Anne Jones, has suggested that the new Prince of Wales will be an "extraordinary ambassador" that will be "above" politics. English Conservative MP Michael Fabricant said that the matter was entirely up to the King and not the first minister of Wales.

Predictions 
Swansea University professor Martin Johnes has suggested that William will be the last Prince of Wales, stating: “If I was a gambling man I would say William will probably be the last Prince of Wales because I imagine that one of the things the monarchy will do in the future is try and lose anything that's contentious and Prince of Wales is a contentious title." “So I suspect that when we see William become King - he won't pass that title on. He will try and reinvent the monarchy to be something stripped-down, relevant and non-contentious.”

Opinion polls 
Opinion polls on individuals in Wales, show more support for the title Prince of Wales to continue and for another investiture compared to opposition, although less support for another investiture compared to the title, and some polls showing no majority opinion.

A BBC Wales poll in 1999, showed 73% of Welsh speakers believing the title should continue after Charles. 70% of those polled believed he has not spent enough time in Wales over the last 30 years, and almost 50% felt he is "concerned with personal interests".

A BBC poll in 2009, 40 years following the investiture, revealed 58% of Welsh people support the title "Prince of Wales" with 58% supporting a investiture of a new Prince of Wales when Charles becomes king. 26% opposed the title. However only 16% responded that Wales had benefited from having a prince.

In July 2018, an ITV poll stated 57% of Welsh people in support the title passing to Prince William, with 22% for abolishment or vacating the title. Support for another investiture was lower, with 31% supporting a ceremony similar to the 1969 one, 18% supporting a ceremony different to 1969 and 27% opposing an investiture.

A BBC Wales 2019 poll showed 50% supporting the continuation of the title and 22% opposing the continuation of the title. On the investiture, 41% supported a similar ceremony to 1969, 20% a different-style investiture ceremony, and 30% opposing any future investiture.

A 2021 poll by Beaufort Research for Western Mail showed 61% of respondents in Wales supported another investiture, including 60% of Welsh-speakers polled.

A June 2022, ITV/YouGov poll showed 46% of adults in Wales wanted the Prince of Wales title to continue, 31% said it should be abolished, with 23% don't knows.

In September 2022, a YouGov poll showed 66% support for Prince William to be given the title compared to 22% opposed, with 19% supporting a 1969-style investiture, 30% a different style of investiture and 34% opposing any investiture of Prince William as Prince of Wales.

Graphical poll summary on the Prince of Wales title

Opinion polls on the title Prince of Wales in Wales

Opinion polls on the investiture of the Prince of Wales in Wales

Type of investiture

Investiture support

Notes

See also 

 List of movements in Wales
 List of rulers of Wales
 Welsh republicanism

References 

Controversies in Wales
Politics of Wales
Republicanism in Wales
Princes of Wales
British monarchy